Miller Theater, originally the Sam S. Shubert Theatre and formerly the Merriam Theater, is Philadelphia's most continuous location for touring Broadway show theatre. It is located at 250 South Broad Street within the Avenue of the Arts cultural district of Center City Philadelphia. The Theatre was built by The Shubert Organization in 1918. In 1972, the theater came under the ownership of the Academy of Music, and was owned by the University of the Arts. In November 2016, it was purchased by the Kimmel Center for the Performing Arts.

History
Lee and J. J. Shubert, theatrical producers, set out to build a theater memorializing their brother, Sam, who had died several years earlier in a railroad accident. Two theaters were built, one in Philadelphia and one in New York. The Shubert Theatre in Philadelphia was built in 1918 on the site of the demolished Horticultural {Agricultural} Hall that included the reuse of the hall's marble staircase in the theaters' interior design. The building stands seven stories high with theater on the first level and six floors used for offices and classrooms. Herbert J. Krapp is the original architect. Additions and renovations were made in 1958.

In 1986, the stage and sound was modernized, and in 1991, the theatre was renamed and dedicated to John W. Merriam, a local entrepreneur, who was active for many years on the board of directors of the University of the Arts.

As of March 2022, the theater has been renamed Miller Theater in honor of Alan B. Miller, a founding board member of the Kimmel Center for the Performing Arts who donated an undisclosed amount of money toward restorations and upgrades.

Productions
The theater opened in 1918 with a road production of a musical from London and New York called Chu Chin Chow, featuring Florence Reed. In the early years, George Gershwin musicals and Al Jolson reviews graced the Shubert stage. John Barrymore played Hamlet in the 1920s and burlesque was featured in the 1930s. Other performers included: Helen Hayes, Katharine Hepburn, Sammy Davis Jr., Angela Lansbury, and Laurence Olivier. Through the decades a number of highly acclaimed Broadway, off-Broadway and one-night performances have been performed at the theater.

Pre- and Post-Broadway engagements at the Shubert:

 1922: Hitchy-Koo of 1922 1927: Strike Up the Band, Funny Face, The Circus Princess 1928: Treasure Girl 1930: Girl Crazy 1931: Everybody's Welcome 1932: Face the Music 1944: Glad to See You 1944: Sadie Thompson 1945: Are You With It? 1946: Shootin' Star, Annie Get Your Gun, Around the World, Street Scene  
 1947: Music in My Heart, Bonanza Bound 1948: Kiss Me, Kate, Inside U.S.A., Sleepy Hollow, That's The Ticket, Brigadoon 1950: The Consul, Guys and Dolls, Out of This World 
 1951: Make a Wish, Paint Your Wagon 
 1952: Shuffle Along, Of Thee I Sing 1953: Hazel Flagg, Kismet 1954: Fanny, Silk Stockings, Plain and Fancy 1955: The Amazing Adele 1956: Mr. Wonderful, Strip For Action, The Most Happy Fella, Ziegfeld Follies of 1956, Happy Hunting, Bells Are Ringing 1957: Jamaica, Rumple, The Music Man 1958: Oh Captain!, Whoop-Up 1959: Redhead, Destry Rides Again, Gypsy, Take Me Along, Saratoga     
 1960: Greenwillow, The Unsinkable Molly Brown, Do Re Mi 1961: 13 Daughters, The Happiest Girl in the World, Donnybrook!, How to Succeed in Business Without Really Trying, Kean, Subways Are for Sleeping 1962: I Can Get It for You Wholesale, We Take the Town, La Belle, Stop the World – I Want to Get Off, Nowhere to Go But Up 1963: Hot Spot, Here's Love, 110 in the Shade, The Girl Who Came to Supper 1964: High Spirits, Golden Boy, Ben Franklin in Paris, Something More!, Bajour, Kelly 
 1965: Royal Flush, Drat! The Cat!, The Yearling, Sweet Charity 
 1966: It's a Bird...It's a Plane...It's Superman, Mame, Walking Happy 1967: Illya Darling, Sherry!, Henry, Sweet Henry, How Now, Dow Jones 1968: Here's Where I Belong, George M!, Her First Roman, The Fig Leaves Are Falling 1970: Lovely Ladies, Kind Gentlemen, Ari 1971: Lolita, My Love 1972: The Selling of the President, Irene 1974: Over Here!, Miss Moffat 1976: My Fair Lady, So Long, 174th Street 1979: I Remember Mama''

ReferencesNotes'''

External links
 Interior architecture photos

Theatres in Philadelphia
Landmarks in Philadelphia
Tourist attractions in Philadelphia
Shubert Organization
Center City, Philadelphia
Theatres in Pennsylvania